Charles Haynes could refer to: 

Charles Eaton Haynes (1784–1841), American politician and physician
Charles Lyman Haynes (1870–1947), American architect

See also
Charles Haines (disambiguation)